Gardezi (also spelled Gardezy or Gardizi) refers to someone whose origin can be traced back to the city of Gardez in Afghanistan. 

There have been a few known Sayyid families from Gardez who migrated to different parts of Pakistan. Their descendants still carry the surname Gardezi. Sayyid Gardezi community are traditionally the descendants of Sayyid Muhammad Shah Yusaf Gardezi. Mostly Sayyid Gardezi are living in Azad Kashmir and Multan, Pakistan.

Same as the Sayyid who carry the surname "Bukhari". Bukhara today is in Uzbekistan. Most Sayyid Bukhari are traditionally descendants of Imam Ali Naqi so they can be called Naqvi too.

People 
Abu Sa'id Gardezi, 11th century Persian historian
Aziza Gardizi, Afghan politician
Sameer Asad Gardezi (born 1983), Pakistani screenwriter
Syed Hussain Jahania Gardezi, Pakistani politician

See also 
Gardēzī Sadaat

References

External links
Gardez District, Afghanistan (Archived)

Surnames
Pakistani names
Muslim communities of Pakistan